Seura is a Finnish magazine published 49 issues per year in Helsinki, Finland and has been in circulation since 1934.

History and profile
The first issue of Seura was published in 1934 by Yhtyneet Kuvalehdet. A sample issue was published in the previous year.

The magazine is part of the Otava Group and its publisher is Otavamedia. The magazine targets family-oriented women in their 40s or older and is published 49 issues per year. The headquarters of the magazine is in Helsinki.

Seura mostly covers articles on education, parenting, health issues, food, travelling, and world affairs. It lost its market share to magazines that concentrate on celebrity gossip. Jari Lindholm was appointed as editor-in-chief in September 2004 to regain market share. Lindholm resigned on 14 April 2006 after failing to improve circulation. The current editor-in-chief is Erkki Meriluoto.

On 15 April 2005 Seura printed a story about Prime Minister Matti Vanhanen's and Minister of Culture Tanja Karpela's common night in a hotel room. The story was based on an anonymous source and was dismissed as "slimy gossip".

Circulation
Seura had a circulation of 189,600 copies in 2007. The 2010 circulation of the magazine was 165,051 copies. Its circulation was 158,720 copies in 2011 and 143,385 copies in 2012. It fell to 133,766 copies in 2013.

See also
 List of magazines in Finland

References

External links
 

1934 establishments in Finland
Finnish-language magazines
Magazines established in 1934
Magazines published in Helsinki
Women's magazines published in Finland